Alexander Hunter Murray  (1818 or 1819 – 20 April 1874) was a Hudson's Bay Company fur trader and artist.

Life
According to the Parish Registers at the General Register Office in Edinburgh four brothers were registered at Crawfordjohn, Lanarkshire:

 Thomas Hunter Murray on October 25, 1813
 Alexander William Hunter Murray on October 22, 1815
 William Murray on April 13, 1817
 Ebenezer Murray on May 21, 1819

Alexander, William and Ebenezer were all in Canada by 1841, but found steady work very difficult to find. Alex joined the American Fur Company in 1842 and Hudson's Bay Company in 1846.

Work 
In 1847, he established the trading post at Fort Yukon at the juncture of the Yukon and Porcupine rivers in the land of the Gwichʼin people. Originally part of Russian Alaska, the Hudson's Bay Company continued to trade there until expelled by the US government in 1869 following the Alaska Purchase.

He drew numerous sketches of fur trade posts and of people and wrote Journal of the Yukon, 1847–48, which give valuable insight into the culture of local First Nation people at the time.

On 4 April 1975 Canada Post issued 'Dance of the Kutcha-Kutchin' in the Indians of Canada, Indians of the Subarctic series. The stamp was designed by Georges Beaupré based on a drawing by Alexander Hunter Murray (1851) in Library and Archives Canada, Ottawa, Ontario. The 8¢ stamps are perforated 13.5 and were printed by Canadian Bank Note Company, Limited.

References

External links
Biography at the Dictionary of Canadian Biography Online

1874 deaths
Canadian fur traders
Russian America
History of Yukon
Year of birth uncertain